The 2017 FAI Senior Challenge Cup was the 97th season of the knockout national Football competition of the Republic of Ireland. The winners of this season's cup earned a place in the 2018–19 Europa League and would have entered in the first qualifying round.

Cork City were the defending champions and went on to retain the cup after a 5-3 win on penalties against Dundalk in the final on 5 November.	

The tournament began the weekend of 30 April 2017 with the preliminary round, which was contested by sixteen non-league clubs.

Teams

Preliminary round
The draw for the preliminary round was held 15 March 2017.

First round
The first round was played between the eight first round winners, the four clubs which received byes in the preliminary round, and the twenty League of Ireland clubs. The first round draw was held on 21 July 2017.

Second round
The second round draw was held on 14 August 2017.

Quarter–finals
The quarter-finals draw was held on 28 August 2017.

Semi–finals
The semi-finals draw was held on 11 September 2017.

Replay

Final

See also
 2017 League of Ireland Premier Division
 2017 League of Ireland First Division

References

External links
 soccerway
 UEFA

 
FAI Cup seasons